The Embassy of Canada in Washington, D.C. is Canada's main diplomatic mission to the United States. The embassy building designed by Arthur Erickson and opened in 1989 is located at 501 Pennsylvania Avenue Northwest, Washington, D.C., between the United States Capitol and the White House, just north of the National Gallery of Art. In addition to its diplomatic role, the embassy provides consular services for Delaware, Washington, D.C., Maryland, Virginia, and West Virginia. It also hosts a Trade Commissioner Service office, which has Maryland, Washington, D.C., Virginia, and West Virginia as its responsibilities.

History 
The Embassy of Canada was originally located at 1746 Massachusetts Avenue NW on Embassy Row, in a house that had been purchased in 1927 from the widow of Clarence Moore, a financier who died in the sinking of the RMS Titanic. The location subsequently became the Embassy of Uzbekistan.

By 1969, the chancery had spread across three buildings and could not accommodate additional staff. At the same time, the federally chartered Pennsylvania Avenue Development Corporation was looking to revitalize the avenue. In 1978, the Canadian government purchased a vacant lot on Pennsylvania Avenue NW for $5 million. The site had been a Ford dealership (built in 1916 by Irwin and Leighton as Ford Service Building) and a public library. The six floor building was demolished before it was purchased by the Government of Canada.

The embassy building was officially opened by Prime Minister Brian Mulroney on May 3, 1989. The building houses approximately 265 Canadian diplomatic and locally engaged staff. The embassy houses representatives from two provinces (Ontario and Alberta) and 13 Canadian federal government agencies, including Foreign Affairs, International Trade and Development Canada, Industry Canada, Transport Canada, Public Works and Government Services Canada, the Department of National Defence, the Permanent Mission of Canada to the Organization of American States, the Royal Canadian Mounted Police, amongst others. Additionally, the Government of Quebec's Ministry of International Relations and La Francophonie has operated a bureau in Washington since 1978; it is located near McPherson Square.

Canada has the embassy closest to the Capitol Building and is the only country to have its embassy along the presidential inaugural route between the Capitol Building and the White House. 
 
The Embassy of Canada hosts numerous events throughout the year for visiting ministers as well as for a wide range of diplomatic, military, and public functions.

Architecture 
The Pennsylvania Avenue NW building was designed by British Columbia's Arthur Erickson, one of Canada's most decorated architects. Erickson tried to evoke a sense of Canada in the architecture of the building, using long horizontals, wide open spaces and water features. The large airy courtyard includes the sculpture Spirit of Haida Gwaii by Bill Reid, featured on Canada's twenty-dollar bill from 2004 to 2012, which sits in a pool of water representative of Canada's ocean limits.

The "Rotunda of the Provinces" on the courtyard's southeast corner has a domed roof that is supported by 12 pillars, each featuring one of the crests of the ten provinces and two territories in existence at the time of the embassy's construction. The seal above the rotunda's entranceway represents the territory of Nunavut, which was established in April 1999. The rotunda is also an echo chamber; noise is reflected and focused back, though this magnified volume is only appreciated by the person at the rotunda's centre. Surrounding the rotunda is a waterfall, incorporated by the architect to represent Niagara Falls, the most famous site along the Canada–U.S. border.

In the words of former U.S. Secretary of State James Baker, "I think just as diplomats represent their country, people and interest to the world, so too an embassy chancery displays its country's face to the world…This bold and dramatic building, the new Chancery of Canada does that. Monumental in its appearance, it also I think conveys the warmth and the openness of the people of Canada. Your new home here in the centre of our new capital [is] along an avenue which is steeped in the history of American democracy between the White House and the Congress."

Artwork
The Embassy of Canada has four collections on display: the Foreign Affairs Fine Art Collection (a permanent collection at the embassy), the Canada Council Art Bank, the Imperial Oil collection and the Scotiabank Corporate Art collection. The embassy also currently has several arctic-themed works that are on loan from TD Bank, in honour of Canada's 2013–2015 chairship of the Arctic Council. The Foreign Affairs Fine Art Collection contains Canadian art for use in Embassies and Official Residences abroad. By displaying Canadian art in this manner, the collection assists in the promotion of Canadian culture abroad.

The Canada Council Art Bank is a collection of Canadian art that is loaned to Canadian government departments, agencies and private sector corporations.

Imperial Oil has lent the embassy 10 works from their corporate collection, providing a regional perspective of Canadian art. Of particular note are the works "Heart of the Forest" by Emily Carr and the Group of Seven's, A.J. Casson's piece "Morning near Whitefish Falls."

The Scotiabank Corporate art collection is one of the leading corporate art collections in Canada, consisting of significant works of art by renowned Canadian contemporary artists. This includes photography by Edward Burtynsky and Geoffrey James and a silkscreen on paper by Christopher Pratt.

The embassy also has a small gallery set just off of the main foyer that showcases Canadian artists or Canada-themed exhibits. In September 2014, the gallery hosted a special exhibit honouring the embassy's 25th anniversary.

Ambassador
Canada's 24th Ambassador to the United States was David MacNaughton, who presented his credentials to President Barack Obama on March 3, 2016. MacNaughton previously served as Canadian and North American president of Hill and Knowlton, and president of Public Affairs International, which purchased Decima Research to create Public Affairs Resource Group.

MacNaughton left the post at the end of August 2019, and was replaced by Acting Ambassador of Canada to the United States Kirsten Hillman. 

Kirsten Hillman was appointed Canada's Ambassador to the United States in March 2020. Prior to her position as Acting Ambassador, Hillman served as Deputy Ambassador in Washington from August 2017 to August 2019. Before joining the Embassy of Canada in Washington, D.C., Ambassador Hillman held multiple positions with Global Affairs Canada, practised law in Montréal and Ottawa, and was educated at the University of Manitoba and McGill University.

Consulates general
The ambassador is also ultimately responsible for the 12 regional consulates:

Consulate General of Canada in Atlanta, serving the states of Georgia, Alabama, Mississippi, North Carolina, South Carolina, and Tennessee
Consulate General of Canada in Boston, serving the states of Maine, Massachusetts, New Hampshire, Vermont, and Rhode Island, as well as the French overseas collectivity of Saint Pierre and Miquelon 
Consulate General of Canada in Chicago, serving the states of Illinois, Wisconsin, and Missouri, as well as the northwestern portions of Indiana in metropolitan Chicago, the portions of Kansas in metropolitan Kansas City, and the portions of Iowa in the Quad Cities area
Consulate General of Canada in Dallas, serving the states of Arkansas, Louisiana, New Mexico, Oklahoma, and Texas
Consulate General of Canada in Denver, serving the states of Colorado, Montana, Wyoming, and Utah, as well as all of Kansas outside metropolitan Kansas City
Consulate General of Canada in Detroit, serving the states of Michigan, Ohio, and Kentucky, as well as all of Indiana outside metropolitan Chicago
Consulate General of Canada in Los Angeles, serving Southern California, Clark County/Las Vegas in Nevada, and the state of Arizona
Consulate General of Canada in Miami, serving the U.S. state of Florida and the U.S. territories of Puerto Rico and the U.S. Virgin Islands
Consulate General of Canada in Minneapolis, serving the states of Minnesota, Nebraska, North Dakota, South Dakota, and the portions of Iowa outside the Quad Cities area
Consulate General of Canada in New York City, serving the states of New York, Connecticut, Delaware, New Jersey, and Pennsylvania, as well as the British overseas territory of Bermuda
Consulate General of Canada in San Francisco/Silicon Valley,  serving Northern California, the state of Hawaii, and all of the state of Nevada except Clark County/Las Vegas
Consulate General of Canada in Seattle, serving the states of Washington, Alaska, Idaho, and Oregon

Trade offices 
Canadian Consulate in Houston
Palo Alto
San Diego

Gallery

See also
Canada-United States relations
Embassy of the United States in Ottawa
List of Canadian ambassadors to the United States
Architecture of Washington, D.C.

References

External links

Connect2Canada.com

Canada
Washington
Canada–United States relations
Government buildings completed in 1989
1980s architecture in the United States
Arthur Erickson buildings